Ralph Henry Miller (January 14, 1899 – February 18, 1967) was an American professional baseball player. He played in Major League Baseball for one game as a pitcher for the Washington Senators on September 16, .

Ralph's older brother Bing Miller played 16 seasons in the Major Leagues from 1921 through 1936.

References

External links

1899 births
1967 deaths
Major League Baseball pitchers
Baseball players from Iowa
Washington Senators (1901–1960) players
People from Vinton, Iowa
Regina Senators players